Alfred Mossman Landon (September 9, 1887October 12, 1987) was an American oilman and politician who served as the 26th governor of Kansas from 1933 to 1937. A member of the Republican Party, he was the party's nominee in the 1936 presidential election, and was defeated in a landslide by incumbent President Franklin D. Roosevelt.

Born in West Middlesex, Pennsylvania, Landon spent most of his childhood in Marietta, Ohio, before moving to Kansas. After graduating from the University of Kansas, he became an independent oil producer in Lawrence, Kansas. His business made him a millionaire, and he became a leader of the liberal Republicans in Kansas. Landon won election as Governor of Kansas in 1932 and sought to reduce taxes and balance the budget in the midst of the Great Depression. He supported many components of the New Deal but criticized some aspects that he found inefficient.

The 1936 Republican National Convention selected Landon as the Republican Party's presidential nominee. He proved to be an ineffective campaigner and carried just two states in the election. After the election, he left office as governor and never sought public office again. Later in life, he supported the Marshall Plan and President Lyndon B. Johnson's Great Society programs. He gave the first in a series of lectures, now known as the Landon Lecture Series, at Kansas State University. Landon lived to the age of 100 and died in Topeka, Kansas, in 1987. His daughter, Nancy Kassebaum, represented Kansas in the United States Senate from 1978 to 1997.

Early life and education
Landon was born in 1887 in West Middlesex, Pennsylvania, the son of Anne Mossman and John Manuel Landon. Landon grew up in Marietta, Ohio. He moved with his family to Kansas at age 17 and graduated from the University of Kansas in 1908. Landon first pursued a career in banking, but in 1912 he became an independent petroleum producer in Independence, Kansas. During World War I, he joined the Army and was selected for assignment as an officer.  He was commissioned in the Chemical Corps and attained the rank of captain.  He was preparing to depart for France when the Armistice ended the war, so he was discharged and returned to Kansas.

By 1929, his career in the oil industry had made him a millionaire, and he was instrumental in the establishment of the Kansas-Oklahoma division of the United States Oil and Gas Association, then known as the Mid-Continent Oil and Gas Association, a petroleum lobbying organization.

He was married to Margaret Fleming until her death in 1918.

Career
Landon supported Theodore Roosevelt's Progressive Party in 1912, and by 1922, was private secretary to the governor of Kansas. He later became known as the leader of the liberal Republicans in the state. He was elected chairman of the Republican state central committee in 1928 and directed the successful Republican presidential and gubernatorial campaigns in Kansas in that year.

In 1930, however, incumbent Republican Kansas governor Clyde M. Reed failed to gain renomination, as he was defeated by challenger Frank Haucke, who would later go on to lose the general election to Harry H. Woodring. The election left the Kansas Republican Party damaged and divided. Landon decided to run in 1932 as a candidate who would reunite the Kansas GOP, and he won the nomination.

Landon was elected Governor of Kansas in the general election, where he defeated both the incumbent Democrat Woodring and independent challenger John R. Brinkley in a closely contested race. He was re-elected governor in 1934, over Democrat Omar B. Ketchum (whose campaign was directed by Clyde Short); Gov. Frank Merriam of California and Landon were the only Republican governors in the nation to be re-elected that year. As governor, Landon gained a reputation for reducing taxes and balancing the budget.  Landon is often described as a fiscal conservative who nevertheless believed that government must also address certain social issues.  He supported parts of the New Deal and labor unions.

During the 1932 presidential campaign, a degree of animosity developed between Landon and then U.S. President Herbert Hoover. Osro Cobb of Arkansas, a friend of both men, tried to bring about a reconciliation, as he explains in his memoirs:

For reasons I never understood, some friction developed between President Hoover and my friend, Governor Landon, who had a summer place in Evergreen, Colorado ... I was in and out of Colorado during the summers and visited frequently with Governor Landon. I was eager to get him and the President together in hopes of bringing about a reconciliation that would benefit them personally and the Republican Party. All of us were at the Broadmoor Hotel in Colorado Springs for a meeting, which I saw as an opportunity to get them together ... for dinner, but whatever undercurrent existed remained, and they continued to be cool toward each other. President Hoover was one of the great Americans of this century. He was competent, compassionate, and a man of unequaled qualifications. The country paid an awful price when he was sacrificed by political caprice.

During his gubernatorial years, Landon attempted to address the needs of his Depression-battered state while still advancing the Republican Party. After his speech at the Cleveland convention in 1936, Landon stated, "My chief concern in this crisis is to see the Republican Party name its strongest possible candidate and a man that would be a good president." During the election year, Landon called for a "special session of the Legislature to enact measures to bring Kansas within the requirements of the federal social security program."

1936 presidential election

In 1936, Landon sought the Republican presidential nomination opposing the re-election of Roosevelt. At the 1936 Republican National Convention, Landon's campaign manager John Hamilton mobilized the younger elements of the party against the faction led by Herbert Hoover. Landon won the nomination on the first ballot; the convention selected Chicago newspaper publisher (and Roosevelt's future Secretary of the Navy) Frank Knox as his running mate.

Landon proved to be an ineffective campaigner who rarely traveled. Most of the attacks on Roosevelt and Social Security were developed by Republican campaigners rather than Landon himself.  In the two months after his nomination he made no campaign appearances. As columnist Westbrook Pegler lampooned, "Considerable mystery surrounds the disappearance of Alfred M. Landon of Topeka, Kansas ... The Missing Persons Bureau has sent out an alarm bulletin bearing Mr. Landon's photograph and other particulars, and anyone having information of his whereabouts is asked to communicate direct with the Republican National Committee."

Landon respected and admired Roosevelt and accepted much of the New Deal but objected that it was hostile to business and involved too much waste and inefficiency.  Late in the campaign, Landon accused Roosevelt of corruption – that is, of acquiring so much power that he was subverting the Constitution. Landon said:

The President spoke truly when he boasted ... 'We have built up new instruments of public power.' He spoke truly when he said these instruments could provide 'shackles for the liberties of the people ...  and ... enslavement for the public.' These powers were granted with the understanding that they were only temporary. But after the powers had been obtained, and after the emergency was clearly over, we were told that another emergency would be created if the power was given up. In other words, the concentration of power in the hands of the President was not a question of temporary emergency. It was a question of permanent national policy. In my opinion the emergency of 1933 was a mere excuse ... National economic planning—the term used by this Administration to describe its policy—violates the basic ideals of the American system ... The price of economic planning is the loss of economic freedom. And economic freedom and personal liberty go hand in hand.

The 1936 presidential election was extraordinarily lopsided. Although Landon accrued nearly seventeen million votes and obtained the endorsement of track star Jesse Owens, he lost the popular vote by more than 10 million votes. He lost his home state of Kansas and carried only Maine and Vermont for a total of eight electoral votes to Roosevelt's 523. On the same day, Republicans lost control of the Kansas governorship, as Democrat Walter A. Huxman was elected as his successor as governor.  FDR's win was the most lopsided electoral victory since the 1820 election. The overwhelming Roosevelt victory prompted Democratic National Committee chair James Farley to jokingly update the political maxim "As Maine goes, so goes the nation" to "As Maine goes, so goes Vermont".

Later life
Following his defeat, Landon finished out his term as Governor of Kansas and returned to the oil industry. Landon did not seek elected office again.

The Republicans' defeats in 1932 and 1936 plunged their party into a period of bitter intra-party strife. Landon played an important role in ending this internal bickering in 1938 by helping to prepare a new group of leaders for the presidential campaign of 1940, and in trying to bring about a compromise between the isolationist and internationalist viewpoints in foreign policy. Landon declined a position in Franklin Roosevelt's Cabinet because he made his acceptance contingent upon the President's renunciation of a third term.

After war broke out in Europe in 1939, Landon fought against isolationists such as America First Committee who supported the Neutrality Act; he feared it would mislead Nazi Germany into thinking the United States was unwilling to fight. In 1941, however, he joined isolationists in arguing against lend-lease, although he did urge that United Kingdom be given $5 billion outright instead.

After the war, he backed the Marshall Plan, while opposing high domestic spending. After the communist revolution in China, he was one of the first to advocate recognition of Mao Zedong's communist government, and its admission to the United Nations, when this was still a very unpopular position among the leadership and followers of both major parties.

In 1961, Landon urged the United States to join the European Common Market. In November 1962, when he was asked to describe his political philosophy, Landon said: "I would say practical progressive, which means that the Republican party or any political party has got to recognize the problems of a growing and complex industrial civilization. And I don't think the Republican party is really wide awake to that." Later in the 1960s, Landon backed President Lyndon Johnson on Medicare and other Great Society programs.

On December 13, 1966, Landon gave his first "Landon Lecture" at Kansas State University in Manhattan, Kansas. Landon's lecture, titled "New Challenges in International Relations" was the first in a series of public issues lectures that continues to this day and has featured numerous world leaders and political figures, including seven U.S. presidents (Richard Nixon, Gerald Ford, Jimmy Carter, Ronald Reagan, George H. W. Bush, Bill Clinton and George W. Bush).

Landon addressed the Republican National Convention in 1976 in Kansas City.

Final years

President Ronald Reagan and his wife Nancy attended Landon's hundredth birthday party at his home in Topeka. Describing Landon as "the living soul of Kansas", the 76-year old-Reagan remarked, "You don't know what a joy it is for a fella like me to go to a birthday party for someone who can, in all honesty, call me a kid." Landon, standing with the use of a walking stick, told the President and well-wishers at the party, "It's a great day in my life. And it's a great day in the lives of all of us to have had the privilege that we have today of meeting with the President of the United States and Mrs. Reagan." White House Chief of Staff Howard Baker married Landon's daughter Nancy nine years later.

Landon died in Topeka on October 12, 1987, at 5:25 p.m., thirty-three days after celebrating his hundredth birthday, and is interred at Mount Hope Cemetery in Topeka. At the time of his death, he was survived by his second wife, Theo Cobb.

Descendants
Landon's daughter, Nancy Landon Kassebaum, was a United States Senator from Kansas. Elected to the U.S. Senate in 1978, she was re-elected in 1984 and 1990. Her second husband was her former Senate colleague Howard Henry Baker, Jr., of Tennessee (1925–2014). His nephew was actor Hal Landon Jr.

Electoral history

Kansas gubernatorial election, 1932
Alf Landon (R) – 278,581 (34.82%)
Harry Hines Woodring (D, Inc.) – 272,944 (34.12%)
John Romulus Brinkley (I) – 244,607 (30.58%)

Republican primary for Governor of Kansas, 1934
Alf Landon (Inc.) – 233,956 (79.87%)
John Romulus Brinkley – 58,983 (20.14%)

Kansas gubernatorial election, 1934
Alf Landon (R, Inc.) – 422,030 (53.51%)
Omar B. Ketchum (D) – 359,877 (45.63%)
George M. Whiteside (Socialist) – 6,744 (0.86%)

Republican presidential primaries, 1936
William E. Borah – 1,478,676 (44.48%)
Alf Landon – 729,908 (21.96%)
Frank Knox – 527,054 (15.85%)
Earl Warren – 350,917 (10.56%)
Stephen A. Day – 155,732 (4.69%)
Warren E. Green – 44,518 (1.34%)
Leo J. Chassee – 18,986 (0.57%)
Herbert Hoover – 7,750 (0.23%)
Frederick Steiwer – 3,285 (0.10%)
Franklin D. Roosevelt (write-in) – 1,159 (0.04%)

1936 Republican National Convention
Alf Landon – 984 (98.11%)
William E. Borah – 19 (1.89%)

1936 United States presidential election
Franklin D. Roosevelt/John Nance Garner (Democratic) – 27,752,648 (60.8%) and 523 electoral votes (46 states carried)
Alf Landon/Frank Knox (Republican) – 16,681,862 (36.5%) and 8 electoral votes (2 states carried)
William Lemke/Thomas C. O'Brien (Union) – 892,378 (2.0%) and 0 electoral votes
Norman Thomas/George A. Nelson (Socialist) – 187,910 (0.4%) and 0 electoral votes
Earl Browder/James W. Ford (Communist) – 79,315 (0.2%) and 0 electoral votes
 Others – 53,586 (0.1%) and 0 electoral votes

References

Further reading
McCoy, Donald R. Landon of Kansas (1966) standard scholarly biography
 Mayer, George H. "Alf M. Landon, as Leader of the Republican Opposition, 1937–1940." Kansas Historical Quarterly 1966 32(3): 325–333. online

External links
Alf Landon's Obituary (New York Times)
Alfred M. Landon Lecture Series on Public Issues (Kansas State University)
Alf Landon and Social Security Reform by Nicholaus Mills, Dissent, Spring 2005.
Governor Alf Landon Digital Collection (KGI Online Library – State Library of Kansas)

 

|-

|-

1887 births
1987 deaths
20th-century American politicians
American businesspeople in the oil industry
American centenarians
Methodists from Kansas
United States Army personnel of World War I
Businesspeople from Kansas
Republican Party governors of Kansas
Landon family
Men centenarians
Military personnel from Kansas
Military personnel from Pennsylvania
People from Mercer County, Pennsylvania
Politicians from Marietta, Ohio
Politicians from Topeka, Kansas
Republican Party (United States) presidential nominees
United States Army officers
Candidates in the 1936 United States presidential election
University of Kansas alumni
People from Independence, Kansas